Davie is a town in Broward County, Florida, United States, approximately  north of Miami. The town's population was 110,320 at the 2020 census. Davie is a principal town of the Miami metropolitan area, which was home to an estimated 6,198,782. Horseback riding is common, as much of its historic buildings include ranches and other Western establishments.

History 
Prior to European colonization, the Tequesta were the native people of what is now Davie. A few campsites and graves have been found in Davie, the oldest dating back 5,000 to 7,000 years in Pine Island Ridge. After Spanish colonization, many of the Tequesta died and the remaining few escaped to Havana with the Spanish when Florida became a British colony, or they assimilated into the newly arrived Seminoles in the late 18th century.

Geography

Demographics

2020 census

As of the 2020 United States census, there were 105,691 people, 35,708 households, and 24,675 families residing in the town.

2010 census

As of 2010, there were 37,306 households, with 8.0% being vacant. As of 2000, 36.7% had children under the age of 18 living with them, 51.8% were married couples living together, 12.6% had a female householder with no husband present, and 31.1% were non-families. 22.3% of all households were made up of individuals, and 6.3% had someone living alone who was 65 years of age or older. The average household size was 2.64 and the average family size was 3.13.

In the town, the population was spread out, with 26.4% under the age of 18, 8.2% from 18 to 24, 33.4% from 25 to 44, 22.6% from 45 to 64, and 9.4% who were 65 years of age or older. The median age was 36 years. For every 100 females, there were 95.1 males. For every 100 females age 18 and over, there were 91.4 males.

The median income for a household in the town was $47,014, and the median income for a family was $56,290. Males had a median income of $38,756 versus $30,016 for females. The per capita income for the town was $23,271. About 6.9% of families and 9.8% of the population were below the poverty line, including 10.3% of those under age 18 and 7.1% of those age 65 or over.

As of 2000, those who spoke only English at home made up 75.47% of the population, while those who spoke Spanish made up 18.74%, and French speakers made up 1.13% of residents. A few other languages spoken were Italian at 0.73%, Chinese at 0.53%, Portuguese 0.51%, and Haitian Creole being the mother tongue of 0.38% of the population.

Arts and culture

Points of interest include:
 
 Bergeron Rodeo Grounds
 Nova Southeastern University
 Old Davie School
 Flamingo Gardens
 Miami Dolphins Training Facility
 Pine Island Ridge
 Fort Lauderdale Florida Temple

Education

Colleges and universities

 Nova Southeastern University
 Florida Atlantic University (Davie Campus)
 University of Florida (Davie Campus)
 Broward College (Central Campus)
 McFatter Technical College

Public schools
Broward County Public Schools operates public schools.

Elementary schools

 Davie Elementary School
 Flamingo Elementary School
 Fox Trail Elementary School
 Hawkes Bluff Elementary School (opened in 1989)
 Silver Ridge Elementary School
 Nova Dwight D. Eisenhower Elementary School (district-wide magnet)
 Nova Blanche Forman Elementary School (district-wide magnet)

Middle schools

 Indian Ridge Middle School
 Nova Middle School (magnet)

High schools

 Western High School
 College Academy @ BC
 McFatter Technical High School – Takes students from southern sections of Broward County
 Nova High School – District-wide

Public charter schools
 Championship Academy of Distinction at Davie

Private schools

Catholic schools are under the Roman Catholic Archdiocese of Miami:
 St. David's Catholic Elementary/Middle School
 St. Bonaventure School (Catholic Elementary/Middle)
 St. Bernadette School (in the Davie city limits, has a Hollywood address)

Other private schools
 The Master's Academy
 Conservatory Prep Senior High School – an arts-integrated school for grades 8–12
 David Posnack Jewish Day School
 University School of Nova Southeastern University

Media
Davie is a part of the Miami-Fort Lauderdale-Hollywood media market, which in 2005 was the twelfth largest radio market and the seventeenth largest television market in the United States.

Notable people
Richard Bleier (born 1987), Major League Baseball pitcher with the Boston Red Sox
Nick Castellanos (born 1992), Major League Baseball right fielder for the Philadelphia Phillies
Michael Gottlieb (born 1968), member of the Florida House of Representatives
Scott Israel (born 1956/57), Police Chief of Opa-locka, former Sheriff of Broward County
Scott Storch (born 1973), record producer and songwriter

References

External links

 Town of Davie official website

 
1909 establishments in Florida
Former census-designated places in Florida
Populated places established in 1909
Towns in Broward County, Florida
Towns in Florida